The Writers Guild of America Award for Television: Children’s Script is an award presented by the Writers Guild of America to the writers of children’s television. Separate categories for series, specials, and longform have been created.

Winners and nominees

1950s

Children’s Script 
1957: Thelma Robinson with Claire Kennedy and Warren Wilson (story) – Lassie ("The Visitor") (CBS)
Lillie Hayward – The Mickey Mouse Club ("Spin and Marty") (ABC)
Dwight Babcock – Walt Disney Presents ("Tribute to Joel Chandler Harris") (ABC)
1958: Kenneth A. Enochs – Circus Boy ("Elmer the Rainmaker") (ABC)
Claire Kennedy – Lassie ("Transition") (CBS)
Craig P. Gilbert – Let's Take a Trip ("Pre-Inauguration") (CBS)
Harold Mehling – Let's Take a Trip ("Search for Antibiotics") (CBS)
Yasha Frank – Rexall Special ("Pinocchio") (NBC)

1970s

Children’s Script 
1976: Yanna Kroyt Brandt – Vegetable Soup ("The Superlative Horse") (NBC)
Tony Kayden – ABC Afterschool Special ("Fawn") (ABC)
Herbert Baker and Sylvia Fine Kaye – CBS Festival of Lively Arts for Young People ("Danny Kaye's Look-In at the Metropolitan Opera") (CBS)
W. W. Lewis – Go USA ("Go Away Kid: You Bother Me") (NBC)
1977: Arthur Barron – ABC Afterschool Special ("Blind Sunday") (ABC)
W. W. Lewis – NBC Special Treat ("Big Henry and the Polka Dot Kid") (NBC)
Jan Hartman – Bound for Freedom (NBC)
Alfa-Betty Olsen and Marshall Efron – God's Country ("Part II") (CBS)
1978: Art Wallace – Little Vic (ABC)
Jan Artman – ABC Afterschool Special ("Hewitt's Just Different") (ABC)
Jim Inman – ABC Afterschool Special ("The Pinballs") (ABC)
Jean Holloway – Once Upon a Brothers Grimm (CBS)
1979: Irma Reichert and Daryl Warner – ABC Afterschool Special ("Mom and Dad Can't Hear Me") (ABC)
Jon Stone and Joseph A. Bailey – Christmas Eve on Sesame Street (PBS)
Barra Grant – NBC Special Treat ("The Tap Dance Kid") (NBC)

1980s

Children’s Script 
1980: Edward Pomerantz – NBC Special Treat ("New York City Too Far From Tampa Blues") (NBC)
Jeffrey Kindley – ABC Afterschool Special ("Make Believe Marriage") (ABC)
Liz Coe – Friends ("Going Out") (ABC)
David R. Axelrod, Joseph A. Bailey, Andy Beckerman, Richard Camp, Sherry Coben, Bruce Hart, Carole Hart, and Marianne Meyer – Hot Hero Sandwich ("Show #4") (NBC)
1981: Paul A. Golding and David Irving (story) – Wonderful World of Disney ("The Secret of Lost Valley") (NBC)
Kimmer Ringwald – CBS Library ("Animal Talk") (CBS)
George Arthur Bloom – CBS Library ("The Incredible Book Escape") (CBS)
Edward Pomerantz – ABC Weekend Specials ("The Gold-Bug") (ABC)
1982: W. W. Lewis – NBC Special Treat ("Sunshine's On the Way") (NBC)
Jeffrey Kindley and Len Jenkin – ABC Afterschool Special ("Family of Strangers") (ABC)
Kimmer Ringwald – CBS Children’s Mystery Theatre ("The Treasure of Alpheus Winterborn") (CBS)
1983: Josef Anderson – CBS Afternoon Playhouse ("First Kill") (CBS)
Buz Kohan – ABC Afterschool Special ("Goldie and the Kids...Listen To Us") (ABC)
Jeri Taylor with Sydney Julien (story) – ABC Afterschool Special ("Please Don't Hit Me, Mom") (ABC)
Johnny Dawkins – ABC Afterschool Special ("The Wave") (ABC)
1984: Arthur Heinemann – ABC Afterschool Special ("The Woman Who Willed a Miracle") (ABC)
1984: Jon Stone and Joseph A. Bailey – Sesame Street ("Big Bird in China") (PBS)
Carole Hart, Bruce Hart, and Sherry Coben – NBC Special Treat ("Oh Boy! Babies!") (NBC)
1985: Jeffrey Kindley – ABC Afterschool Special ("The Great Love Experiment") (ABC)
Stephen H. Foreman – ABC Afterschool Special ("Cougar") (ABC)
Dianne Dixon – ABC Afterschool Special ("A Different Twist") (ABC)
Norman Stiles – Sesame Street ("Goodbye Mr. Hooper") (PBS)
1986: Charles Johnson and John Allman with Avon Kirkland (story) – WonderWorks ("Booker") (PBS)
Jeanne Betancourt – ABC Afterschool Special ("I Want To Go Home") (ABC)
Marisa Gioffre – Workin' For Peanuts (HBO)
1987: Nancy Audley with Christine Burrill and Richard Soto (story) – WonderWorks ("Maricela") (PBS)
Kathryn J. Montgomery & Jeffrey Auerbach – CBS Schoolbreak Special ("Babies Having Babies") (CBS)
Mick Garris – Wonderful World of Disney ("Fuzz Bucket") (ABC)
Mark Rosman – Wonderful World of Disney ("Time Flyer") (ABC)
1988: Joseph Maurer – CBS Schoolbreak Special ("An Enemy Among Us") (CBS)
Joanna Lee – CBS Schoolbreak Special ("Juvi") (CBS)
James Orr and Jim Cruickshank – Wonderful World of Disney ("Young Harry Houdini") (ABC)
1989: Blanche Hanalis – Hallmark Hall of Fame ("The Secret Garden") (CBS)
Victoria Hochberg – ABC Afterschool Special ("Just a Regular Kid: An AIDS Story") (ABC)
Joanna Lee – ABC Afterschool Special ("The Kid Who Wouldn't Quit: The Brad Silverman Story") (ABC)
Paul W. Cooper – CBS Schoolbreak Special ("Gangs") (CBS)
Kathryn J. Montgomery with Steve Faigenbaum (story) – CBS Schoolbreak Special ("Home Sweet Homeless") (CBS)
Everett Greenbaum and Harvey Bullock with Jim Shorts and Chris Solada (story) – A Mouse, A Mystery and Me (NBC)

1990s

Children’s Script 
1990: Bruce Harmon – ABC Afterschool Special ("Taking a Stand") (ABC)
Jeffrey Auerbach – CBS Schoolbreak Special ("No Means No") (CBS)
Paul W. Cooper – CBS Schoolbreak Special ("A Matter of Conscience") (CBS)
Alan L. Gansberg – CBS Schoolbreak Special ("My Past Is My Own") (CBS)
Jon Stone – Sesame Street ("Big Bird in Japan") (PBS)
1991: Josef Anderson – ABC Afterschool Special ("The Perfect Date") (ABC)
1991: Cynthia A. Cherbak, Elizabeth Hansen, and Herbert Stein – CBS Schoolbreak Special ("American Eyes") (CBS)
Harry Longstreet and Renee Longstreet – CBS Schoolbreak Special ("The Frog Girl: The Jenifer Graham Story") (CBS)
1992: Betty G. Birney – CBS Schoolbreak Special ("But He Loves Me") (CBS)
Michael Winship – 3-2-1 Contact ("Down the Drain") (PBS)
Gordon Rayfield – CBS Schoolbreak Special ("It's Only Rock and Roll") (CBS)
Paul W. Cooper – CBS Schoolbreak Special ("Abby, My Love") (CBS)
Joanna Lee and Annie Caroline Schuler – CBS Schoolbreak Special ("The Fourth Man") (CBS)
1993: Daryl Busby and Susan Amerikaner – Adventures in Wonderland ("Pretzelmania") (The Disney Channel)
Daryl Busby and Tom J. Astle – Adventures in Wonderland ("What Makes Rabbit Run?") (The Disney Channel)
Bruce Harmon – Lifestories: Families in Crisis ("Public Law 106: The Becky Bell Story") (HBO)
Carol Starr Schneider – CBS Schoolbreak Special ("Two Teens and a Baby") (CBS)
David D. Connell, James F. Thurman, Michael Winship, and Susan Kim – Mathnet ("The Case of the Calpurnian Kugle Caper") (PBS)
1994: Robert L. Freedman – Lifestories: Families in Crisis ("A Deadly Secret: The Robert Bierer Story") (HBO)
Daryl Busby and Deborah Raznick – Adventures in Wonderland ("Dinner Fit for a Queen") (The Disney Channel)
Daryl Busby and Tom J. Astle – Adventures in Wonderland ("Fiesta Time") (The Disney Channel)
Daryl Busby and Phil Baron – Adventures in Wonderland ("On a Roll") (The Disney Channel)
Daryl Busby and Daniel Benton – Adventures in Wonderland ("The Red Queen Crown Affair") (The Disney Channel)
Bruce Harmon – CBS Schoolbreak Special ("Love Off Limits") (CBS)
Willy Holtzman – Lifestories: Families in Crisis ("Blood Brothers: The Joey DiPaola Story") (HBO)
Michael Winship – Square One TV ("Sneaky Peeks") (PBS)
1995: Bruce Harmon – Lifestories: Families in Crisis ("The Coming Out of Heidi Leiter") (HBO)
1995: Carin Greenberg Baker with Kermit Frazier – Ghostwriter ("Don't Stop the Music") (PBS)
1995: Lynn Montgomery – Mrs. Piggle-Wiggle ("The Radish Cure") (Showtime)
1996: Gordon Rayfield – CBS Schoolbreak Special ("Stand Up") (CBS)
Philip J. Walsh, Barry Friedman, and Mark Waxman, with Richard Albrecht and Casey Keller – Beakman's World ("Sharks, Beakmania & Einstein") (CBS)
Pamela Douglas – CBS Schoolbreak Special ("Between Mother and Daughter") (CBS)
Carol Starr Schneider – CBS Schoolbreak Special ("Between Mother and Daughter") (CBS)
Tony Geiss – Sesame Street ("A Baby Worm Is Born") (PBS)
1997: Dan M. Angel and Billy Brown – Goosebumps ("The Cuckoo Clock of Doom") (FOX)
Courtney Flavin – ABC Afterschool Special ("Educating Mom") (ABC)
Mollie Fermaglich – Allegra's Window ("Strange Vetfellows") (Nickelodeon)
Eric Weiner – Gullah Gullah Island ("Look Who's Balking") (Nickelodeon)
Katherine Lawrence – Hypernauts ("Ice Bound") (ABC)
George Daugherty and Janis Diamond – Peter and the Wolf (ABC)
Ronnie Krauss – Reading Rainbow ("Fly Away Home") (PBS)
1998: Christine Ferraro and Tony Geiss – Elmo Saves Christmas (PBS)
1998: David Steven Cohen – The Wubbulous World of Dr. Seuss ("The Song of the Zubble-Wump") (Nickelodeon)
Tony Geiss – Sesame Street ("The Bountiful Tree") (PBS)
Gary Cooper and Allan Neuwirth – The Wubbulous World of Dr. Seuss ("The Great Mystery of Lake Winna-Bango") (Nickelodeon)
Will Ryan and Craig Shemin – The Wubbulous World of Dr. Seuss ("The Road To Ka-Larry") (Nickelodeon)
1999: Christine Ferraro – Sesame Street ("Telly as Jack") (PBS)
Jeff Schechter – Brink! (Disney Channel)
Susan Kim – The Mystery Files of Shelby Woo ("The Case of the MacBeth Mystery") (Nickelodeon)
Jeff Stetson – Nickelodeon Sports Theater ("First Time") (Nickelodeon)
William Robertson and Alex Zamm – Wonderful World of Disney ("My Date with the President's Daughter") (ABC)
Robert L. Freedman – Wonderful World of Disney ("Cinderella") (ABC)
John Martel – The Wubbulous World of Dr. Seuss ("The Cat In The Hat's First First-Day") (Nickelodeon)

2000s

Children’s Script (2000-2005) 
2000: Wendy Biller and Christopher Hawthorne – Sea People (Showtime)
Eric Weiner – Are You Afraid of the Dark? ("The Tale of the Secret Admirer") (Nickelodeon)
Eric Tuchman – Dear America ("A Journey to the New World") (HBO)
Susan Kim – The Mystery Files of Shelby Woo ("The Case of the Crooked Campaign") (Nickelodeon)
Shari Goodhartz – Young Hercules ("Hind Sight") (FOX)
2001: Paris Qualles – The Color of Friendship (Disney Channel)
2001: Rod Serling – A Storm in Summer (Showtime)
Mitchell Kriegman – Bear in the Big Blue House ("A Berry Bear Christmas") (Disney Channel)
Joel Kauffmann and Donald C. Yost – Miracle in Lane 2 (Disney Channel)
Christine Ferraro – Sesame Street ("The Big Bad Wolf Fills in for Goldilocks") (PBS)
2002: Anna Sandor – My Louisiana Sky (Showtime)
Jacqueline Feather and David Seidler – By Dawn's Early Light (Showtime)
Shari Goodhartz – Dragonheart: A New Beginning (Sci-Fi Channel)
Julie Nathanson – Just Deal ("Have Your Cake") (NBC)
Terri Minsky – Lizzie McGuire ("Pool Party") (Disney Channel)
2003: Gordon Rayfield – Our America (Showtime)
Christine Ferraro – Elmo's World: Happy Holidays! (PBS)
Glenn Gers – Off Season (Showtime)
Mark Saltzman and Jeffrey Rubin (story) – The Red Sneakers (Showtime)
2004: Paul W. Cooper – The Maldonado Miracle (Showtime)
Joel Silverman, Joel Kauffmann, and Donald C. Yost – Full-Court Miracle (Disney Channel)
Thom Eberhardt – I Was A Teenage Faust (Showtime)
Willie Reale and Mark Palmer – Out There ("Don't Look Back") (The N)
2005: Wendy Kesselman – A Separate Peace (Showtime)
Susan Shilliday – A Wrinkle in Time (ABC)

Long Form or Special 
2006: Willy Holtzman – Edge of America (Showtime)
Jessica Sharzer and Ann Young Frisbie – Speak (Showtime)
2007: not awarded
Billy Brown and Dan Angel – The Haunting Hour: Don't Think About It (Cartoon Network)
2009: Polly Draper – The Naked Brothers Band ("Polar Bears") (Nickelodeon)

Episodic and Specials 
2006: Kevin Arkadie – Miracle's Boys ("New Charlie") (The N)
Ronnie Krauss – Reading Rainbow ("Visiting Day") (PBS)
Christine Ferraro – Sesame Street ("Baby Bear's First Day of School") (PBS)
2007: Alana Sanko – Just For Kicks ("Meet The Power Strikers") (Nickelodeon)
DJ MacHale – Flight 29 Down ("Scratch") (Discovery Kids)
David Steven Cohen – Phil of the Future ("Broadcast Blues") (Disney Channel)
Ronnie Krauss – Reading Rainbow ("Show Way") (PBS)
Deborah Swisher – That's So Raven ("Fur Better Or Worse") (Disney Channel)
2008: DJ MacHale – Flight 29 Down ("Look Who's Not Talking") (Discovery Kids)
Polly Draper – The Naked Brothers Band ("Nat is a Stand Up Guy") (Nickelodeon)
2009: Joseph Mazzarino – Elmo's Christmas Countdown (ABC)
Scott Gray and Rick Gitelson – Imagination Movers ("The Un-Party") (Disney Channel)
Arika Lisanne Mittman – South of Nowhere ("Spencer's 18th Birthday") (The N)

2010s

Long Form or Special 
2010: Erik Patterson and Jessica Scott – Another Cinderella Story (ABC Family)
2011: Julie Sherman Wolfe and Amy Talkington – Avalon High (Disney Channel)
2012: not awarded
2013: Anne De Young and Ron McGee – Girl vs. Monster (Disney Channel)
2014: not awarded
2015: not awarded
2016: Josann McGibbon and Sara Parriott – Descendants (Disney Channel)
2017: Geri Cole and Ken Scarborough - Once Upon a Sesame Street Christmas (HBO)
Nick Turner, Rex New, and Cameron Fay - Dance Camp (YouTube)
Billy Brown and Dan Angel - R.L. Stine's Monsterville: Cabinet of Souls (Freeform)

Episodic and Specials 
2010: Max Burnett – The Troop ("Welcome to the Jungle") (Nickelodeon)
Randi Barnes, Rick Gitelson, and Scott Gray – Imagination Movers ("A Monster Problem") (Disney Channel)
Scott Gray, Randi Barnes, Rick Gitelson, and Michael G. Stern – Imagination Movers ("Mouse And Home") (Disney Channel)
Joseph Mazzarino – Sesame Street ("Frankly, It's Becoming A Habitat") (PBS)
Christine Ferraro – Sesame Street ("Wild Nature Survivor Guy") (PBS)
Dan Kopelman – True Jackson, VP ("The Rival") (Nickelodeon)
 2011: Scott Gray, Randi Barnes, Rick Gitelson, and Michael G. Stern – Imagination Movers ("Happy Ha-Ha Holidays") (Disney Channel)
Andy Gordon – True Jackson, VP ("True Magic") (Nickelodeon)
2012: Leo Chu and Eric S. Garcia – Supah Ninjas ("Hero Of The Shadows") (Nickelodeon)
Dan Schneider and Matt Fleckenstein – iCarly ("iLost My Mind") (Nickelodeon)
Jennifer Heftler, Randi Barnes, Rick Gitelson, Vivien Mejia, and Michael G. Stern – Imagination Movers ("The Prince Frog") (Disney Channel)
Joseph Mazzarino – Sesame Street ("The Good Birds Club") (PBS)
Max Burnett – The Troop ("Oh, Brother") (Nickelodeon)
Devin Bunje and Nick Stanton – Zeke and Luther ("Luther Turns 4") (Disney XD)
2013: Christine Ferraro – Sesame Street ("The Good Sport") (PBS)
2014: Vincent Brown – ANT Farm ("influANTces") (Disney Channel)
Jim Krieg – Spooksville ("The Haunted Cave") (Hub Network)
Christine Ferraro – Sesame Street ("Simon Says") (PBS)
2015: Bob Smiley – The Haunted Hathaways ("Haunted Heartthrob") (Nickelodeon)
Matthew Nelson – Girl Meets World ("Girl Meets 1961") (Disney Channel)
Boyce Bugliari and Jamie McLaughlin – The Haunted Hathaways ("Haunted Crushing" aka "Haunted Sisters") (Nickelodeon)
2016: Gretchen Enders and Aminta Goyel – Gortimer Gibbon's Life on Normal Street ("Gortimer, Ranger and Mel vs. The Endless Night") (Amazon)
Mark Blutman – Girl Meets World ("Girl Meets I am Farkle") (Disney Channel)
Garrett Frawley and Brian Turner – Gortimer Gibbon's Life on Normal Street ("Gortimer and the Surprise Signature") (Amazon)
David Anaxagoras and Luke Matheny – Gortimer Gibbon's Life on Normal Street ("Gortimer vs The Relentless Rainbow of Joy") (Amazon)
Laurie Parres – Gortimer Gibbon's Life on Normal Street ("Ranger and The Fabled Flower of Normal Street") (Amazon)
2017: Laurie Parres - Gortimer Gibbon's Life on Normal Street ("Mel vs. The Night Mare of Normal Street") (Amazon)
Joshua Jacobs and Michael Jacobs - Girl Meets World ("Girl Meets Commonism") (Disney Channel)
John-Paul Nickel - Just Add Magic ("Just Add Mom") (Amazon)
Belinda Ward - Sesame Street ("Mucko Polo, Grouch Explorer") (HBO)

External links
Official WGA website 

Writers Guild of America Awards